Josef Richard Vilímek is name of two Czech publishers:

 Josef Richard Vilímek (1835–1911), father
 Josef Richard Vilímek (1860–1938), son